Richard Romanus (born Richard Joseph Romanos; February 8, 1945) is an American actor. Among other roles, he has appeared in Martin Scorsese's Mean Streets and provided voices for Ralph Bakshi's animated films Wizards and Hey Good Lookin'. He played Richard La Penna, Jennifer Melfi's ex-husband, later husband again, in four episodes of The Sopranos from 1999 to 2002. In 1999, he co-wrote the Christmas film If You Believe along with his wife Anthea Sylbert, which was nominated for a Best Original Screenplay award by the Writers Guild of America.

Personal life
Romanus was born in Barre, Vermont, the son of Eileen (née Maloof) and Dr. Raymond Romanos. He lived in West Hartford, Connecticut, and in 1964 graduated from Xavier University with a bachelor's in philosophy, before studying acting with Lee Strasberg at the Actors Studio in New York. His younger brother Robert Romanus is also an actor. They both appeared in the MacGyver episode "The Prodigal" in 1985. He is of Lebanese descent. On May 20, 1967, he married Tina Bohlmann; they had a son before divorcing in 1980.

Romanus has been married to Oscar-nominated costume designer Anthea Sylbert since August 11, 1985. In 2004, they moved to the Greek island of Skiathos, and since then he has focused on writing. In 2011, he published his memoirs, Act III (Aiora Press, Athens, and Armida Publications, Nicosia), and first novel, Chrysalis (Armida Publications). In 2012, Act III was short-listed for the International Rubery Book Award.

Filmography
This is a list of films that have featured Richard Romanus.

Films

 1968 – The Ghastly Ones as Don
 1973 – Mean Streets as Michael
 1974 – The Gravy Train as Carlo
 1975 – Russian Roulette as Ragulia
 1977 – Wizards as Weehawk (voice)
 1977 – Night Terror (TV movie) as The Killer
 1979 – Gold of the Amazon Women (TV movie) as Luis Escobar
 1980 – Sitting Ducks as Joe 'Moose Joe' Mastaki
 1981 – Heavy Metal as Harry Canyon (voice)
 1982 – Pandemonium as Jarrett
 1982 – Hey Good Lookin' as Vinnie (voice)
 1983 – Strangers Kiss as Frank Silva
 1984 – Crackups (TV movie)
 1984 – More than Murder (TV movie) as Bordante
 1984 – Second Sight: A Love Story (TV movie) as Dr. Ross Harkin
 1984 – Protocol as The Emir
 1986 – Murphy's Law as Frank Vincenzo 
 1987 – Ghost of a Chance (TV movie) as Julio Mendez 
 1988 – The Couch Trip as Harvey Michaels 
 1989 – Married to the Mob (TV movie) as Tony 
 1990 – Hollywood Heartbreak as Niles Gregory
 1990 – Final Stage as The Producer 
 1991 – Oscar as Vendetti
 1991 – The Entertainers (TV movie) as 'Chick' 
 1992 – To Protect and Serve as Captain Malouf 
 1993 – Point of No Return as Fahd Bahktiar 
 1994 – Cops & Robbersons as Fred Lutz 
 1995 – The Rockford Files: A Blessing in Disguise (TV movie) as Penguinetti 
 1998 – Urban Relics as Charlie Shivers
 1998 – Giving Up the Ghost (TV movie) 
 1999 – Carlo's Wake as Carmine D'Angelo
 1999 – If You Believe (TV movie)
 2001 – Nailed as Uncle Robert
 2003 – The Young Black Stallion as Ben Ishak

Television (partial)

 1970 – Mission: Impossible – Episode "Gitano" as Guard 
 1970–71 – The Mod Squad (as Richard Romanos) – Appeared In Two Episodes
 1974 – Rhoda – Episode: "9-E is Available" as Luis Alvarez
 1974 – Kojak – Episode: "The Betrayal" as Detective Sam Calucci 
 1977 – Charlie's Angels – Episode: "The Big Tap-Out" as Roy David 
 1977 – Starsky & Hutch – Episode: "Huggy Bear and the Turkey" as 'Sonny' Watson 
 1978 – Rockford Files – Episode: "Three Day Affair with a Thirty Day Escrow" as Sean Innes
 1978 – Hawaii Five-O - Episode: "Small Potatoes" as Johnny Noah
 1981–82 – Strike Force 
 1983 – Cagney & Lacey – Episode: "Let Them Eat Pretzels"
 1984 – Hunter – Episode: "High Bleacher Man"
 1985 – Tales from the Darkside – Episode: "Bigalow's Last Smoke" as Frank Bigalow
 1985 – MacGyver – Episode "The Prodigal" (as brother to his real-life brother Robert Romanus)
 1989 – Midnight Caller – Episode "Trash Radio" as Maurice Maxwell
 1989 – Mission Impossible – Episode "The Fixer" as Arthur Six
 1996 – Diagnosis: Murder – Episode "Misdiagnosis Murder" as Dr. Ed Quiller

Bibliography
 Act III, 2011 (Aiora Press, Athens, and Armida Publications, Nicosia)
 Chrysalis, 2011 (Armida Publications, Nicosia)

Awards and nominations
 1999 – Best Original Screenplay in Long Form Television - Writers Guild of America
 2012 – Short-listed for the International Rubery Book Award for Act III

References

External links

 High School Yearbook Picture of Richard and Robert Romanos

1945 births
American male film actors
American male voice actors
Male actors from Vermont
Living people
People from Barre, Vermont
American male writers
American people of Arab descent
American people of Lebanese descent
Songwriters from Vermont
American emigrants to Greece